is a Lutheran mass in C minor by Gottfried Heinrich Stölzel. He set the text of Kyrie and Gloria in German in 1739.

History 
Stölzel, a prolific composer of cantatas, wrote the Deutsche Messe for four-part choir, string orchestra and basso continuo in 1739, setting two parts from the mass ordinary in German, suitable for Lutheran church services. It was published by Bärenreiter.

References

External links 
 
 

Stolzel
1739 compositions
Compositions in C minor